Nasril Izzat Jalil (born 15 April 1990 in Terengganu) is a Malaysian footballer currently playing for Felda United in Malaysia Super League.

References

External links
 Izzat profile

1990 births
Living people
Malaysian footballers
Terengganu FC players
People from Terengganu
Malaysian people of Malay descent
Association football defenders
UiTM FC players
PDRM FA players
Felda United F.C. players